Alan van der Merwe (born 31 January 1980) is a South African race car driver, entrepreneur and former driver of the Formula One medical car, alongside FIA Medical Delegate Dr. Ian Roberts.

Racing career 
Van der Merwe won the 2001 Formula Ford Festival. In 2003 he was the British Formula 3 Champion, and drove for Super Nova Racing in Formula 3000 in 2004. His sponsorship money ran out mid-season and he took a contract as a part-time tester for BAR–Honda.

In 2005 and 2006, Van der Merwe raced in the A1 Grand Prix series for A1 Team South Africa, with a best placed finish of 7th in New Zealand. In 2008, he drove for James Watt Automotive in the 1000 km of Silverstone, part of the 2008 Le Mans Series, finishing in 33rd place and completing 159 laps. He returned to A1 Grand Prix in 2009 in the final round at Brands Hatch.

Van der Merwe was the official driver of the FIA medical car in Formula One events from 2009 until the end of the 2021 season, when he was replaced due to his refusal to be vaccinated against COVID-19. He has since been reinstated as the medical car driver, driving the Aston Martin DBX 707 and the Mercedes-AMG GT 63 S, after rules regarding COVID vaccines in the F1 paddock were relaxed prior to the start of the 2023 season.

Racing record

Complete International Formula 3000 results
(key) (Races in bold indicate pole position; races in italics indicate fastest lap.)

Complete A1 Grand Prix results
(key) (Races in bold indicate pole position) (Races in italics indicate fastest lap)

References

External links 
 Alan van der Merwe at Driver Database

1980 births
A1 Team South Africa drivers
Bonneville 200 MPH Club members
British Formula Three Championship drivers
European Le Mans Series drivers
Formula Ford drivers
International Formula 3000 drivers
Land speed record people
Living people
South African racing drivers
Carlin racing drivers
Haywood Racing drivers
A1 Grand Prix drivers
Super Nova Racing drivers
DAMS drivers